The Brooklyn Gothams were an American basketball team based in Brooklyn, New York that was a member of the American Basketball League.

Before the 1946/47 season the team was known as the New York Gothams.

Year-by-year

Basketball teams in New York City
Sports in Brooklyn